

Portugal
 Angola –
 Francisco Antonio Gonçalves Cardoso, Governor-General of Angola (1865–1868)
 José Rodrigues Coelho do Amaral, Governor-General of Angola (1868–1870)

United Kingdom
 Gibraltar – Richard Airey, Governor of Gibraltar (1865–1870)
 Jamaica – Sir John Peter Grant, Governor of Jamaica (1866–1874)
Malta Colony – Patrick Grant, Governor of Malta (1867–1872)
New South Wales – Somerset Lowry-Corry, Lord Belmore, Governor of New South Wales (1868–1872)
 Queensland 
 Sir George Bowen, Governor of Queensland (1859–1868)
 Colonel Samuel Blackall, Governor of Queensland (1868–1871)
 Tasmania – Colonel Thomas Browne, Governor of Tasmania (1862–1868)
 South Australia – Sir Dominick Daly, Governor of South Australia (1862–1868)
 Victoria – John Manners-Sutton, Lord Canterbury, Governor of Victoria (1866–1873)
 Western Australia 
 John Hampton, Governor of Western Australia (1862–1868)
 Sir Benjamin Pine, Governor of Western Australia (1868–1869)

Colonial governors
Colonial governors
1868